Show do Tom was a Brazilian comedy and talk show aired by RecordTV and launched on September 27, 2004. Two years ago, the program was on Sunday at 5pm, but now is Sunday 11pm. The program has also changed; before it was recommended free for all, but now is not recommended for children under 10 years.

History
Tom Cavalcante (host) left Rede Globo in July, 2004. In the same year, he started a solo program on RecordTV. Directed by Vildomar Batista, this program obtained 10 points in IBOPE.

Since he was forbidden by justice of presenting the same numbers he used at Rede Globo, he began to do sketches of big productions such as O Aprendiz, hosted b9y Roberto Justus in Brazil. The principal comedic style of the show is improvisational comedy, with emphasis on local talents (or sometimes local street figures) or well-known celebrities. Humourists such as Tiririca and Pedro Manso were hired for the show.

Cast

 Tom Cavalcante
 Solange Damasceno
 Shaolin
 Tiririca 
 Alexandre Frota

Sketches (parodies)

 Mister Geme a Volta do Magico Descarado (parody of Mister M, the Masked Magician);
 Sítio Light: Mudando pra Roça (parody of The Simple Life, from Fox Life);
 Demais pra Você — Com Ana Maria Bela e Galinho José (parody of Mais Você, hosted by Ana Maria Braga);
 Avião do Tom;
 Festival de Piadas;
 Pocket Show/Sofá do Tom;
 O Infeliz - (parody of The Apprentice, in Brazil it's hosted by Roberto Justus);
 Arquivo Tomfidencial;
 Bar do Canabrava;
 Batalha dos Humoristas.

External links
Official Site

RecordTV original programming
Brazilian comedy television series
2004 Brazilian television series debuts
2011 Brazilian television series endings
Portuguese-language television shows